Boros schneideri is a species of beetle belonging to the family Boridae.

It is native to Europe.

References

Tenebrionoidea